The following is a list of plaques placed within the City of Leeds by Leeds Civic Trust to celebrate people or historic sites.

The main ones are cast aluminium 18 inches in diameter with lettering in relief and can be repainted when badly worn.  Where space is limited a 14 inch one is used with fewer words.  in the case of  Whitkirk Manor House (155) a rectangular one was used to get more words in the restricted width. Four (60, 62, 63, 72) are millennium plaques of 20 inches with gold letters and edging.

They are numbered according to the books given in the bibliography up to 180.  181 onwards are numbered according to the date of erection. There is one which is not numbered and green instead of blue. Some are photographed before mounting, others in situ.

There are also printed polymer ones celebrating the LGBT history in Leeds, referred to as Rainbow plaques.

Blue Plaques

Unnumbered Plaque

Rainbow Plaques

References

Bibliography 

Leeds Blue Plaques
History of Leeds
West Yorkshire-related lists
LGBT culture in Leeds